Aeoloderma is a genus of beetles belonging to the family Elateridae.

The species of this genus are found in Japan, Australia.

Species:
 ''Aeoloderma brachmana' (Candeze, 1859)'

References

Elateridae
Elateridae genera